Esther Dzifa Ofori is a Ghanaian diplomat and a member of the New Patriotic Party of Ghana. She is currently Ghana's ambassador to Republic of Equatorial Guinea.

Ambassadorial appointment 
In July 2017, President Nana Akuffo-Addo named Esther Ofori as Ghana's ambassador to Republic of Equatorial Guinea. She was among twenty two other distinguished Ghanaians who were named to head various diplomatic Ghanaian mission in the world.

References

Ambassadors of Ghana to Equatorial Guinea
Ghanaian women ambassadors
Living people
Year of birth missing (living people)